This is a list of the ten holidays in Guinea-Bissau. Employers must compensate workers on these days. Other holidays can be declared at any time.

Public holidays

References 

Bissau-Guinean culture
Guinea-Bissau
Guinea-Bissau